The Satchel Guide was a series of tourist's travel guide books to Europe, first published in 1872 by Hurd & Houghton of New York. It continued annually until at least 1939. Authors included William Day Crockett, Sarah Gates Crockett, William James Rolfe.

References

Further reading
 
 1872 ed. + Index
 1881 ed. + Index
 .  + Index
  + Index

External links
 Hathi Trust. Satchel Guide, 1872-

Travel guide books
Series of books
Publications established in 1872
1872 establishments in New York (state)
Tourism in Europe